Richard Frank Gardner (born December 19, 1944) is a former Major League Baseball pitcher. He holds the distinction of having been traded twice by the New York Yankees to the Oakland Athletics for one of the Alou brothers.

Early years
Gardner originally signed with the Minnesota Twins in 1963 upon graduation from Binghamton High School in Binghamton, New York. He went 17–11 with a 2.46 earned run average his only season in their farm system. Following the season, he was drafted by the New York Mets in the 1963 first-year draft.

New York Mets
He went 20–10 with a 3.51 ERA over two seasons in the Mets' farm system to earn a call up to the majors in September 1965. He lasted just three innings in his first major league start, giving up seven runs (five earned) in an 8–5 loss to the Houston Astros. However, his most memorable start of the season was his final, in which he pitched fifteen innings of shutout ball against the Philadelphia Phillies in a game that was eventually declared a 0–0 tie after eighteen innings.

After getting off to a 2–0 start in 1966, Gardner lost his next six decisions, and was moved into the bullpen. He earned his first major league save July 26 against the Astros, and finished the season at 4–8 with a 5.12 ERA. He started the 1967 season in the minors, and was shipped to the Chicago Cubs on June 12 with a minor league player to be named later for Bob Hendley.

Cubs and Indians
Gardner spent one season in Chicago, going 0–2 with a 3.98 ERA for the Cubs. Just prior to the start of the 1968 season, he was traded to the Cleveland Indians for Bobby Tiefenauer. He went 9–6 with a 4.32 ERA for the Portland Beavers, and made five appearances for the Indians that September.

Gardner was 0–6 with Portland in 1969 when the Indians struck a deal with to the New York Yankees for John Orsino.

Two trades for two Alou brothers
Gardner finished the 1969 season with the Yankees' triple A affiliate, the Syracuse Chiefs. He went 16–5 with a 2.53 ERA for Syracuse in 1970, and appeared in one game for the Yankees that September.

Gardner was traded along with Ron Klimkowski from the Yankees to the Oakland Athletics for Felipe Alou on April 9, 1971. He was sent back to the Yankees with Darrell Osteen for Curt Blefary on May 25, 1971.

He appeared in twenty games and pitched 97 innings for the Yankees in 1972, which was the most he'd pitched since 1966 with the Mets. Following the season, the Yankees traded him back to the A's with a player to be named later for Matty Alou.

Gardner appeared in three games for the A's in 1973 when his contract was purchased by the Milwaukee Brewers. He appeared in ten games for the Brewers, the last of which, he lasted just a third of an inning and gave up four runs to the A's. Following the game, he was returned to the A's. He spent 1974 in the Detroit Tigers' organization, and 1975 back in the Yankees' farm system before retiring.

Sources

External links

1944 births
Living people
Auburn Mets players
Baseball players from New York (state)
Buffalo Bisons (minor league) players
Chicago Cubs players
Cleveland Indians players
Evansville Triplets players
Florida Instructional League Mets players
Jacksonville Suns players
Major League Baseball pitchers
Milwaukee Brewers players
New York Mets players
New York Yankees players
Oakland Athletics players
Orlando Twins players
Phoenix Giants players
Portland Beavers players
Salinas Mets players
Sportspeople from Binghamton, New York
Syracuse Chiefs players
Tiburones de La Guaira players
American expatriate baseball players in Venezuela
Tucson Toros players
Williamsport Mets players
Wilson Tobs players